Gakulnagar is a census town in West Tripura district  in the state of Tripura, India.

Demographics
 India census, Gakulnagar had a population of 9037. Males constitute 54% of the population and females 46%. Gakulnagar has an average literacy rate of 66%, higher than the national average of 59.5%: male literacy is 73%, and female literacy is 57%. In Gakulnagar, 15% of the population is under 6 years of age.

References

Cities and towns in West Tripura district
West Tripura district